Tunde Seun Olokigbe (born 9 July 1989) is a Nigerian former professional footballer.

Career statistics

Club

Notes

References

External links
 Yau Yee Football League profile
 

Living people
1989 births
Nigerian footballers
Association football midfielders
Hong Kong First Division League players
Hong Kong Premier League players
Shek Kip Mei SA players
Hong Kong FC players
Nigerian expatriate footballers
Nigerian expatriate sportspeople in Hong Kong
Expatriate footballers in Hong Kong